Anna Petrova (born September 15, 1962) is an artist-monumentalist who has made a significant contribution to the creation, recreation and restoration of the historical and religious monuments of the Crimea.

Biography
She was born in Simferopol. in Ukraine, which was then a part of the Soviet Union. Her father, Petrov Ivan Semenovich, was a painter-batalist and her mother, Petrova Nina Petrovna, was a sculptor. 
 Has a bachelor's degree in Crimean Art College from 1978 to 1984. 
 Has a master of arts degree, with specialization of the monumental art in the class of professor A.A. Mylnikov at the Imperial Academy of Arts from 1984 to 1990

Public collections
 Simferopol Art museum. Ukraine
 Museum historical memorial complex "35th Coastal Battery" Sebastopol. Ukraine
 Museum Foundation "Dragon" State of Taiwan, Russian art collection. 
 Museum Podolsky district, Kiev, Ukraine. 
 Kunstshtatsion City Museum Fulda, Germany.

Bibliography
 2013 - The New Florence Biennale ethics dna of art. 
 2012 - "Issues of restoration works of monumental marble sculptures by the example of household Vorontsov Palace " almanac Crimean international scientific readings.
 2010 - " Museums and exhibition Invisible Shadows" magazine " Antiques » № 6 (44). Kiev.
 2009 - "Shoot Beatrice " magazine " Antiques » № 10 (36). Kiev.
 2008 - " Questions restoration" almanac Thirteenth Crimean art history reading. Simferopol.
 2007 - «Navdušenje udeležencev likovne kolonije» Sabina Lokar. Dnevnik 19.07.2007- Article 15 Ljubljana, Slovenia. «Fuldaer Zeitung» November 27. Germany.
 2004 - Magazine "Our » № 9. Dnepropetrovsk. «SYDÖSTRAN» June 8. Karlskrona, Ronneby. Sweden. «BLT» June 8. Blekinge, Sweden. «BLT» May 6. Blekinge, Sweden. «BLT» September 17. Blekinge, Sweden. «Hunfelder Zeitung» № 120.Hunfeld, Germany. " Ukrainian Mistetstvo » (art in Ukraine) № 3. Kiev.
 2003 - Exhibition Catalogue «Kunst der Halbinsel Krim». Germany. «Fuldaer Zeitung» «Hunfelder Zeitung» № 60. Germany.
 2002 - magazine " 24 carat » № 11. Kiev. "The Republic of Crimea » № 6.
 2000 - magazine " 24 carat » № 4 (6). Kiev. "The truth of Ukraine » № 133. Kiev. " Crimean news » № 60 ( 2064 ) " 24 carat " magazine № 3 (5). Kiev. from 1997 to 2004 - design books from publishing house "SONAT" Simferopol.
 1996 - «Rhein-Neckar Zeitung» 19.12.96
 1993 - on stamps in the series " Russian art " in the state of Taiwan.
 1989 - Exhibition Catalogue " Crimean Bookplates 30 years." Crimean ekslibrist club. Simferopol Art Museum.
 1988 - Catalogue of the exhibition "Painting Mozhdysk ancient." Soviet Art from the Academy: Drawings and paintings by the outstanding young artists from the I. E. Repin Institute, Leningrad, the historic art academy of the Soviet Union. By: Boris Ugarov David B. Lawell M. Stephen Doherty Gregory Hedberg (Foreword) Russell Wilkinson (Preface) B000JUXI4G. Publisher: New York Academy of Art - 1988 (Academy of Art in New York).
 1984 - Exhibition Catalogue "Simferopol and Simferopol townspeople"

External links
G’Anna Petrova – Konst runt 11-12 september 2021
Art-bulvar.com
Петрова, Анна Ивановна — Крымология
Sevastopol.su
Artchive.ru
G’Anna Petrova – Konst runt 11-12 september 2021

1962 births
Living people
Artists from Simferopol
20th-century Ukrainian painters
21st-century Ukrainian painters
20th-century Ukrainian women artists
21st-century Ukrainian women artists
Religious artists
Christian artists
Crimean culture
Muralists
Mosaic artists
Women muralists